The Red Cliffs National Conservation Area is a  National Conservation Area located in southwest Utah, north of St. George at the northeasternmost edge of the Mojave Desert. It is managed by the Bureau of Land Management as part of the National Landscape Conservation System, and was created as part of the Omnibus Public Land Management Act of 2009.

The Red Cliffs National Conservation Area (NCA) is part of the larger multi-jurisdictional Red Cliffs Desert Reserve, which was created in 1996 to protect the habitat and populations of the desert tortoise and other species. Part of the NCA was designated in 2009 as the Cottonwood Canyon and Red Mountain wilderness areas, which are part of the National Wilderness Preservation System.

The Pine Valley Mountains and Dixie National Forest are north of the NCA. The NCA is located within the watershed of the Virgin River, a tributary of the Colorado River.

Gallery

References

External links

 Red Cliffs National Conservation Area - BLM page

National Conservation Areas of the United States
Bureau of Land Management areas in Utah
Protected areas of Washington County, Utah
Protected areas established in 2009
Units of the National Landscape Conservation System